Frank T. Gallagher (July 13, 1887 – May 21, 1977) was an American jurist.

Born in Wilton Township, Waseca County, Minnesota, Gallagher graduated from Waseca High School in 1907 and then received his law degree from University of Minnesota Law School in 1913. He practiced law in Austin, Minnesota and then in Waseca, Minnesota. He served on the Waseca School Board. Gallagher served on the Minnesota Supreme Court from 1947 until his retirement in 1963. His brother Henry M. Gallagher also served on the Minnesota Supreme Court. Gallagher died in a hospital in Minneapolis, Minnesota of heart failure after a hip fracture.

Notes

1887 births
1977 deaths
People from Waseca County, Minnesota
University of Minnesota Law School alumni
Minnesota lawyers
School board members in Minnesota
Justices of the Minnesota Supreme Court
20th-century American judges
People from Waseca, Minnesota
20th-century American lawyers